Bratislavská lýra was a Czechoslovak festival of popular songs that took place every year from 1966 until 1990 and was held in Bratislava. It was renewed in 1997 but cancelled again in 1998.

History
The idea for the festival arose between 1964 and 1965 by composers Ján Siváček and Pavel Zelenay, who went on to organize it. The event was first held in 1966 in the Park kultúry a oddychu (PKO), under the name Medzinárodný festival tanečnej piesne Bratislavská lýra ("Bratislava Lýra International Dance Song Festival"), with sound provided by Slovenský rozhlas (later Česko-slovenský rozhlas). Winners received an award called Bratislava Lýra (Bratislava Lyre), which also became the festival's new name in 1968.

In addition to Gold, Silver, and Bronze, other awards included the Zlatý kľúč ("Golden Key"), for international contestants. Categories consisted of the Critics' Award, Journalists' Award, Audience Award, Popular Award, and Lifetime Achievement Award.

Notable winners in the event's first year included famous Czech songster Karel Gott, together with composers Vieroslav Matušík and Eliška Jelínková, for the song "Mám rozprávkový dom". Throughout its years of existence, the festival showcased the talent of some of the biggest musical stars in Czechoslovakia, as well as various international celebrities, including The Beach Boys (1969), Cliff Richard (1970, 1971), Boney M. (1977), Smokie (1983), Donovan (1983), and Joe Cocker (1998 – the last year of the event's revival).

In 1975, the festival won an award from the International Federation of Festival Organizations (FIDOF), being only the fourth festival worldwide to receive this honour, and the first in the Socialist Bloc.

Bratislavská lýra was discontinued in 1990, after the Velvet Revolution. Conductor and music director Vladimír Valovič purchased the trademark in 1996 and revived the festival the following year. The 1997 edition was used to select the Slovak representative for the 1998 Eurovision Song Contest. It was canceled once more in 1998, due to a lack of financial support and sponsorships. As of 2006, Valovič still had plans to relaunch the event at a later date. On 19 October 2016, fifty years after the first edition, the gala concert Lýra 50 Mám rozprávkový dom was held in Bratislava, with the participation of former winners and festival participants.

Controversy
In 1989, Joan Baez invited Ivan Hoffman, who had recorded the anti-communist song "Nech mi nehovoria" (Stop Telling Me), to take the stage. After about a minute, however, the organizers muted his microphone.

References

Song contests
Music festivals in Slovakia
Culture in Bratislava
Music festivals established in 1966
Music competitions
Awards established in 1966
Awards disestablished in 1998
1966 establishments in Czechoslovakia
1998 disestablishments in Slovakia
Slovakia in the Eurovision Song Contest
Eurovision Song Contest selection events